Naser al-Din Shah Qajar (16 July 1831 – 1 May 1896) was the fourth Shah of Qajar Iran from 5 September 1848 to 1 May 1896 when he was assassinated. He was the son of Mohammad Shah Qajar and Malek Jahan Khanom and the third longest reigning monarch in Iranian history after Shapur II of the Sassanid dynasty and Tahmasp I of the Safavid dynasty. Nasser al-Din Shah had sovereign power for close to 51 years.

He was the first modern Persian monarch who formally visited Europe and wrote of his travels in his memoirs. A modernist, he allowed the establishment of newspapers in the country and made use of modern forms of technology such as telegraphs, photography and also planned concessions for railways and irrigation works. Despite his modernizing reforms on education, his tax reforms were abused by people in power, and the government was viewed as corrupt and unable to protect commoners from abuse by the upper class which led to increasing antigovernmental sentiments. He ended up being assassinated when visiting a shrine.

Reign

Effectiveness of his early rule
The state under Naser al-Din was the recognized government of Iran but its authority was undermined by local tribal leaders. The religious and tribal chieftains held quite a bit of autonomy over their communities. Naser al-Din was not effective in implementing his sovereignty over his people. Local groups had their own militias and oftentimes did not obey laws passed by the monarchy since they did not have the power to enforce them. The people followed the ulama's fatwas instead of state issued law. When Naser al-Din took power, his army barely had 3,000 men which was significantly smaller than the armies under various tribal leaders. When the state needed a proper army, he would hire the local militias. Prior to his reforms, Naser's government had very little power over their subjects and even during the reforms, they faced more scrutiny over their ability to implement those reforms successfully.

Diplomacy and wars

Naser al-Din was in Tabriz when he heard of his father's death in 1848, and he ascended to the Sun Throne with the help of Amir Kabir. During his reign he would have to deal with the Revolt of Hasan Khan Salar, as well as insurrections by Babis.

Naser al-Din had early reformist tendencies, but was dictatorial in his style of government. With his sanction, thousands of Bábis were killed, this was in reaction to an assassination attempt from a small group of Bábis. This treatment continued under his prime minister Amir Kabir, who even ordered the execution of the Báb – regarded as a manifestation of God to Bábí's and Baháʼís, and to historians as the founder of the Bábí religion.

Unable to regain the territory in the Caucasus irrevocably lost to Russia in the early 19th century, Naser al-Din sought compensation by seizing Herat, in 1856. Great Britain regarded the move as a threat to British India and declared war on Persia, forcing the return of Herat as well as Persia's recognition of the kingdom of Afghanistan.

Naser al-Din was the first modern Persian monarch to visit Europe in 1873 and then again in 1878 (when he saw a Royal Navy Fleet Review), and finally in 1889 and was reportedly amazed with the technology he saw. During his visit to the United Kingdom in 1873, Naser al-Din Shah was appointed by Queen Victoria a Knight of the Order of the Garter, the highest English order of chivalry. He was the first Persian monarch to be honoured as such. His travel diary of his 1873 trip has been published in several languages, including Persian, German, French, and Dutch.

In 1890 Naser al-Din met British major Gerald F. Talbot and signed a contract with him giving him the ownership of the Persian tobacco industry, but he later was forced to cancel the contract after Ayatollah Mirza Hassan Shirazi issued a fatwa that made farming, trading, and consuming tobacco haram (forbidden). Consuming tobacco from the newly monopolized 'Talbet' company represented foreign exploitation, so for that reason it was deemed immoral. It even affected the Shah's personal life as his wives did not allow him to smoke.

This was not the end of Naser al-Din's attempts to give concessions to Europeans; he later gave the ownership of Persian customs incomes to Paul Julius Reuter.

Reforms
 He defeated various rebels in the Iranian provinces, most notably in Khorasan, he balanced the budget by introducing reforms to the tax system, curbed the power of the clergy in the judiciary, built several military factories, improved relations with other powers to curb British and Russian influence, opened the first newspaper called Vaghaye-Ettefaghieh, embellished and modernized cities (for example by building the Tehran Bazaar) and most importantly opened the first Iranian school for upper education called the Dar ul-Funun where many Iranian intellectuals received their education. However Naser al-Din Shah's reforms were unpopular with some people.

The shah gradually lost interest for reform. However, he took some important measures such as introducing telegraphy and postal services and building roads. He also increased the size of the state's military and created a new group called the Persian Cossack Brigade which was trained and armed by the Russians. He was the first Persian to be photographed and was a patron of photography who had himself photographed hundreds of times. His final prime minister was Ali Asghar Khan, who after the shah's assassination aided in securing the transfer of the throne to Mozaffar al-Din.

Although he was successful in introducing these western based reforms, he was not successful in gaining complete sovereignty over his people or getting them to accept these reforms. The school he opened, Dar al-Funun, had very small enrollment numbers. The restrictions defined by Sh'ia Islam on the shah's collection of the zakat led to those funds going straight into the coffers of the ulama. Therefore, the financial autonomy given to the ulama enabled them to remain structurally independent, keeping madrasahs open and supporting the students therein. The ulama also maintained their authority to challenge state law. To fund these new institutions and building projects, Naser repeatedly used tax farming to increase state revenue. Unfortunately, tax collectors routinely abused their power and the government was viewed as corrupt and unable to protect them from abuse by the upper class. This anti-government sentiment increased the ulama's power over the people because they were able to provide them security. Keddie states in her book, Roots of Revolution: An Interpretive History of Modern Iran, that at the time "it was still considered a sign of greater status to be admitted to the ranks of the ulama than it was to become a member of the civil service."

In 1852 Naser al-Din dismissed and executed Amir Kabir, the famous Persian reformer. With him, many believe, died the prospect of an independent Persia led by meritocracy rather than nepotism.

In the later years of his rule, however, Naser al-Din steadfastly refused to deal with the growing pressures for reforms. He also granted a series of concessionary rights to foreigners in return for large payments. In 1872, popular pressure forced him to withdraw one concession involving permission to construct such complexes as railways and irrigation works throughout Persia. He visited Europe in 1873, 1878 and 1889. In 1890, he granted a 50-year concession on the purchase, sale, and processing of all tobacco in the country, which led to a national boycott of tobacco and the withdrawal of the concession. This last incident is considered by many authorities to be the origin of modern Iranian nationalism.

Assassination

Naser al-Din was assassinated by Mirza Reza Kermani, a follower of Jamāl al-Dīn al-Afghānī, when he was visiting and praying in the Shah Abdol-Azim Shrine on 1 May 1896. It is said that the revolver used to assassinate him was old and rusty, and had he worn a thicker overcoat, or been shot from a longer range, he would have survived the attempt on his life. Shortly before his death, he is reported to have said "I will rule you differently if I survive!" The assassin was prosecuted by the defence minister, Nazm ol-Dowleh.

Nasser-al-Din Shah's assassination and the subsequent execution of Mirza Reza Kermani marked a turning point in Iranian political thought that would ultimately lead to the Iranian Constitutional Revolution during his successor Mozzafar-al-Din Shah's turbulent reign.Naser al-Din was buried in the Shah Abdol-Azim Shrine, in Rayy near Tehran, where he was assassinated. His funeral took place six months after his death. A British diplomat who spoke with some who had been present, Charles Hardinge, commented "... the corpse was conveyed on a very high funeral car and was 'high' in more ways than one". His one-piece marble tombstone, bearing his full effigy, is now kept in the Golestan Palace Museum in Tehran.

Artistic and literary interests
Naser al-Din Shah was very interested in painting and photography. He was a talented painter and, even though he had not been trained, was an expert in pen and ink drawing. Several of his pen and ink drawings survive. He was one of the first photographers in Persia and was a patron of the art. He established a photography studio in Golestan Palace.

Naser al-Din was also a poet. 200 couplets of his were recorded in the preface of Majma'ul Fusahā, a work by Reza-Qoli Khan Hedayat about poets of the Qajar period. He was interested in history and geography and had many books on these topics in his library. He also knew French and English, but was not fluent in either language.

Hekāyāt Pir o Javān ("The Tale of the Old and the Young") was attributed to him by many; it was one of the first Persian stories written in modern European style.

He also wrote the book Diary of H.M. the Shah of Persia during his tour through Europe in A.D. 1873.

Issue

Sons
Prince Soltan Mahmoud Mirza (1847–1849) Vali Ahad of Persia, 1849
Prince Soltan Moin ed-Din Mirza (1849 – 6 November 1856) Vali Ahad of Persia, 1849–56
Prince Soltan Massoud Mirza Zell os-Soltan (5 January 1850 – 2 July 1918)
Prince Mohammad-Qassem Mirza (1850 – 29 June 1858) Vali Ahad of Persia, 1856-8
Prince Soltan Hossein Mirza Jalal od-Dowleh (1852–1868)
Prince Mozaffar ed-Din Mirza (25 March 1853 – 7 January 1907)
Prince Kamran Mirza Nayeb os-Saltaneh (22 July 1856 – 15 April 1929)
Prince Nosrat ed-Din Mirza Salar os-Saltaneh (2 May 1882 – 1954)
Prince Mohammad-Reza Mirza Rokn os-Saltaneh (30 January 1884 – 8 July 1951)
Prince Hossein-Ali Mirza Yamin od-Dowleh (1890–1952)
Prince Ahmad Mirza Azd os-Saltaneh (1891–1939)

Daughters
Princess Afsar od-Dowleh
Princess Fakhr ol-Moluk (1847 – 9 April 1878)
Princess Esmat od-Dowleh (1855 – 3 September 1905)
Princess Zi'a os-Saltaneh (1856 – 11 April 1898)
Princess Fakhr od-Dowleh (1859–1891)
Princess Forugh od-Dowleh (1862–1916)
Princess Eftekhar os-Saltaneh (1880–1941)
Princess Farah os-Saltaneh (1882 – 17 April 1899)
Princess Tadj os-Saltaneh (1883 – 25 January 1936)
Princess Ezz os-Saltaneh (1888–1982)
Princess Sharafsaltaneh

Honours

Persian
 Founder of the Imperial Order of the August Portrait, 1848
 Founder of the Decoration of the Commander of the Faithful, November 1856
 Founder of the Imperial Order of the Aqdas, 1870
 Founder of the Imperial Order of the Sun for Ladies, 1873

Foreign
 Austrian Empire: Grand Cross of the Royal Hungarian Order of Saint Stephen, in Brilliants, 1859
 Grand Duchy of Baden:
 Knight of the House Order of Fidelity, 1889
 Knight of the Order of Berthold the First, 1889
 Kingdom of Bavaria: Knight of the Order of Saint Hubert, 1889
 Belgium: Grand Cordon of the Order of Leopold (military), 4 August 1857
 French Empire: Grand Cross of the Legion d'Honneur, 1855
 Kingdom of Italy:
 Knight of the Supreme Order of the Most Holy Annunciation, 13 April 1861
 Grand Cross of the Order of Saints Maurice and Lazarus, 1862
 Netherlands: Grand Cross of the Order of the Netherlands Lion, 1868
 Ottoman Empire:
 Order of Osmanieh, 1st Class, 1880
 Order of Glory, 1880
 Kingdom of Prussia:
 Knight of the Order of the Black Eagle, 12 January 1860; in Brilliants, 1873
 Grand Cross of the Order of the Red Eagle, in Brilliants, 9 June 1873
 Russian Empire:
 Knight of the Imperial Order of the White Eagle, 1838
 Knight of the Order of Saint Andrew the Apostle the First-called, 1873
 Knight of the Imperial Order of Saint Alexander Nevsky, 1873
 Knight of the Imperial Order of Saint Anna, 1st Class, 1873
 Knight of the Imperial Order of Saint Stanislaus, 1st Class, 1873
 Sweden-Norway: Knight of the Royal Order of the Seraphim, 7 March 1890
 United Kingdom: Stranger Knight of the Most Noble Order of the Garter, 26 June 1873
 Kingdom of Württemberg: Grand Cross of the Order of the Württemberg Crown, 1889

List of premiers

Mirza Taqi Khan Amir Kabir (1848 – 1851) 
Mirza Aqa Khan-e Nuri (1851 – 1858) 
Post abolished (1858–1871)
Mirza Hosein Khan Moshir od-Dowleh Sepahsalar (1871 – 1873) 
Mirza Yousof Khan Ashtiani (1873 – 1880) (1st time) 
Prince Kamran Mirza (1880 – 1885) 
Mirza Yousof Khan Ashtiani (1885–1887) (2nd time) 
Mirza Ali-Asghar Khan Amin os-Soltan (1887 – 1896) (1st time)

Fictional depictions
 Naser al-Din Shah is played by Bahram Radan in 2022 tv series Jeyran.
 Naser al-Din Shah is depicted in 1976 TV series Soltan-e Sahebgharan and also in 1984 TV series Amir Kabir.
 He is also depicted in 1992 movie Nassereddin Shah, Actor-e Cinema (Once Upon a Time, Cinema) written and directed by Mohsen Makhmalbaf and 1984 Kamal ol-Molk directed by Ali Hatami.
 He was the inspiration for the main character of the short story De koning 2002 and the novel De koning 2011 by the Persian–Dutch writer Kader Abdolah.
 It can be inferred from the time period and historical references that Naser al-Din Shah is depicted in the 1990 novel Phantom by Susan Kay which explores the life of the titular character in Gaston Leroux's The Phantom of the Opera.
 In animation form his life depicted by Beate Petersen in Nasseredin Shah and his 84 wives at 2011.
 Joseph Roth: The tale of the 1002nd night: a novel (1939).

See also

Notes

References

External links

Nasser-al-Din Shah's Portrait
Nasseredin Shah and his 84 wives
His visit to England(select from list)
Statue of Nasseredin Shah in Golestan Palace
Side view of Nasser-al-Din Shah's marble tombstone
Coins, banknotes and medals of Qajar period
Window on an Era: A Qajar Royal Album. Selected photographs from a private album of Nasser al-Din Shah, with an introduction by Kaveh Golestan, Kargah
Mohammad-Reza Tahmasbpoor, History of Iranian Photography: Early Photography in Iran, Iranian Artists' site, Kargah
History of Iranian Photography. Postcards in Qajar Period, photographs provided by Bahman Jalali, Iranian Artists' site, Kargah.
History of Iranian Photography. Women as Photography Model: Qajar Period, photographs provided by Bahman Jalali, Iranian Artists' site, Kargah.
 Sir James William Redhouse, The Diary of H.M. the Shah of Persia during His Tour through Europe in A.D. 1873, A Verbatim Translation (John Murray, London, 1874), Internet Archive (Digitized by Robarts at University of Toronto).
 Sir Albert Houtum Schidler and Baron Louis de Norman, A Diary Kept by His Majesty the Shah of Persia during His Journey to Europe in 1878, in English (Richard Bentley & Son, London, 1879), Internet Archive (Digitized by Google).
Photos of qajar kings

1831 births
1896 deaths
19th-century monarchs of Persia
Nasser Al-Din
Murdered Persian monarchs
Deaths by firearm in Iran
People murdered in Iran
People of the Persian Constitutional Revolution
People from Tabriz
Assassinated Iranian politicians
People of the Anglo-Persian War
Iranian photographers
19th-century monarchs in the Middle East
19th-century photographers
Assassinated heads of state
19th-century murdered monarchs
Recipients of the Order of the White Eagle (Russia)
Grand Croix of the Légion d'honneur
Extra Knights Companion of the Garter
Recipients of the Order of Saint Stanislaus (Russian)
Grand Crosses of the Order of Saint Stephen of Hungary
Knights Grand Cross of the Order of Saints Maurice and Lazarus
Recipients of the Order of St. Anna, 1st class
Iranian slave owners
1896 murders in Iran